Old Church may refer to:

 Old Church, New Jersey, United States
 Helsinki Old Church, Finland
 Tampere Old Church, Finland
 The Old Church (Portland, Oregon), United States
 Old Church, County Antrim, a townland in Tickmacrevan, County Antrim, Northern Ireland
 Old Church Formation, a geologic formation from the eastern united states dating to the Oligocene Epoch

See also
 Oude Kerk (disambiguation), Dutch for "Old Church"